Arva Industries was founded in 1979 by Fred Smith and LaVern Eck.

The company is based in St. Thomas, Ontario, and specializes in designing and manufacturing equipment for rail, mining, military, construction and marine sectors.

In 2016, Paul Smith was named president of the company.

Major Products

 Vacuum ballast excavator
 Mining scaler
 35 ton rail bound crane
 Belt service vehicle
 Track vacuum car
Multi-purpose engineering vehicle (MPEV)
Lube service vehicle
All terrain crane
Track utility vehicle
25-ton, 20-ton, 15-ton and 10-ton low-profile mining crane
75' electric crane car

Clients

 Toronto Transit Commission 
 RT2 flat car
 RT4 track re-insulation car
 RT5 tunnel leak repair (grout) car
RT6 vacuum ballast excavator
RT9, 39, 61, 63, 65, 67, 69 single car work car
 RT11 non-motor car
 RT14-15 mk III snow clearing unit
 RT16-17 tunnel washer
 RT28-29 flat car
 RT42 scaffold car
 RT47 flat car
 RT48-49 motored snow blower
 RT55 flat car with crane
 RT56 vacuum rodder car
 RT57 general purpose rail flat car
 RT70 flat car
 RT71 tri-mode work locomotive
RT72-76 dual cab work car
RT77-79 ballast delivery trailer car
RT82-83 hydrostatic car
RT84 vacuum ballast excavator
RT86 dual cab workcar
RT87-88 electric crane car
RT89 track vacuum car
ATP caboose
Port Authority Trans-Hudson (PATH)
35 ton rail bound crane
Port Authority Transit Corporation (PATCO)
Track utility vehicle
New Jersey Transit Corporation
Catenary inspection vehicle
Nutrien 
ARA2025LP mining crane
MC200 mining crane
MC210 mining crane
MC430 mining crane
MC500 mining crane
Dual platform bolter basket
MC350 mining scaler
The Mosaic Company
MC210 mining crane
MC310 mining crane
SV12101 lube service vehicle
SV12140 belt service vehicle
SV12160 mechanic service vehicle
LPC 54 low-profile carrier and crane
LPC 72 low-profile carrier
Dyna Industrial
Epiroc
FMC Green River Wyoming
J&S
Maclean
Marcotte
MTI
Multicrete
Sifto Salt
Tata Chemicals
SNC Lavalin East & West
Canadian Coast Guard
 US Army
 Canadian Army
CJ Pink
Finning/Hytracker

References

External links
 Arva Industries

Rolling stock manufacturers of Canada
St. Thomas, Ontario
Companies based in Ontario
Manufacturing companies of Canada